The tubenose sculpin (Cottus nasalis) is a species of freshwater ray-finned fish belonging to the family Cottidae, the typical sculpins. It inhabits the upper Syr-Darya basin in Kyrgyzstan and Uzbekistan. It reaches a maximum length of 6.9 cm.

References

Cottus (fish)
Taxa named by Lev Berg
Fish described in 1933